Keda Reda is an Egyptian romantic comedy film starring Ahmed Helmy, Menna Shalabi. It has a very simple story about 3 identical triplets.

Keda Reda stars comedian Ahmed Helmy as Semsem (an introvert), Bibo (a soccer fan) and Prince (a 1900s clothes and action fan). The trio, all named Reda (and hence the title of the film), all compete to win the heart of one beautiful girl, played by Menna Shalabi.

The film made it to the top of the Egyptian box office, as it earned more than   The story was inspired by the American film Matchstick Men.

Cast 
 Ahmed Helmy
 Menna Shalabi
 Lotfy Labib
 Khaled El Sawy

References 

2007 films
2000s Arabic-language films
Films with live action and animation
2007 romantic comedy films
Egyptian romantic comedy films